Mrs. O'Leary's Cow can refer to 
 The cow belonging to Mrs. Catherine O'Leary that is often blamed in folklore for starting the Great Chicago Fire of 1871
 "Mrs. O'Leary's Cow" (instrumental), an instrumental song by Brian Wilson